"World So Cold" is a song by Norwegian recording artist A-Lee from his second studio album, Forever Lost (2012). It was released on May 5, 2010 in Norway, on EE Records and Columbia/Sony Music Norway. A-Lee worked with producers Ground Rules and the chorus features  vocals from Marcus Only.

"World So Cold" is A-Lee's breakthrough single and it sold Platinum in Norway and reached #12 at Norwegian Single Charts VG-Lista. The single was the most played song on radio NRK mP3 in 2010 and was also the 6th most played song on all Norwegian radio in 2010.
In 2010, A-Lee performed "World So Cold" at huge annual show VG-Lista Rådhusplassen in Oslo where he attended for the first time.

Track listing

Personnel
 Dope – artwork design
 Björn Engelmann – mastering
 Shahrouz Ghafourian – executive producer, management
 Bjarte Giske – producer, engineer, mixer
 Marcus Ulstad Nilsen – vocals
 Morten Pape – producer, engineer, mixer
 Ali Pirzad-Amoli – vocals, executive producer

Chart positions and certifications

Release history

References

External links
 A-Lee Official Site

2010 singles
2010 songs